"Rock and Roll Madonna" is a song written by English musician Elton John and songwriter Bernie Taupin, and performed by John. The song was released as a single in England in 1970, where it never charted. It appeared on several bootlegs and rarities compilations, such as 1992's Rare Masters, before it appeared on 1995 remaster of his self-titled album and to the 2008 deluxe edition of the same album, along with two previously unreleased demo versions of the song. 

The song structure is a rock and roll song. Live effects have been added, with an audience cheering throughout most of the song, a technique that would be used similarly three years later on "Bennie and the Jets". The B-side, "Grey Seal", was re-recorded in 1973 for inclusion on John's seventh album, Goodbye Yellow Brick Road.

The song was remade in an "interlude" version for the 2019 film Rocketman with star Taron Egerton performing the vocal.

Track listing 
1970 UK 7" single
 "Rock and Roll Madonna" – 4:17
 "Grey Seal (Original Version)" – 3:38

Personnel 
 Elton John – piano, vocals
 Caleb Quaye – guitar
 Roger Pope – drums
 Dave Glover – bass

Rocketman (2019) film 
The 2019 biopic Rocketman featured 22 of Elton John's songs including hits, like "Your Song", and uncharted songs, like "Rock and Roll Madonna". In the film, "Rock and Roll Madonna" is featured as an interlude version with the vocals performed by actor Taron Egerton.

Notes

References

Elton John songs
1970 songs
Songs with music by Elton John
Songs with lyrics by Bernie Taupin